The Remix Collection is a remix album by Belgian singer Natacha Atlas. It was released by Mantra Records on 19 September 2000.

Critical response

In a review for PopMatters, Wilson Neate praised Atlas' mixture of "Arabic vocal styles, Middle Eastern pop and Western electronic dance beats." Pitchfork Media reviewer Mark Richard-San said that The Remix Collection was "just about perfect from the dancefloor perspective" and named the remix of "Amulet" by 16B as the album's best track. Rick Anderson of AllMusic wrote that the album is "as good as one would expect."

Track listing
"Mon Amie La Rose" (French remix) - 3:28[A]
"Duden" featuring Ashiqali Kham and Nawazish Khan (Talvin Singh remix) - 6:10
"Yalla Chant" (Youth remix) - 6:19
"Yalla Chant" (Banco De Gaia remix) - 5:22
"Amulet" (16B remix) - 8:24
"Yalla Chant" (Transglobal Underground remix) - 6:05
"Amulet" (TJ Rehmi remix) - 5:26
"One Brief Moment" (Klute remix) - 6:04
"Bastet" (Bullitnuts remix) - 7:07
"Duden" featuring Ashiqali Kham and Nawazish Khan (Spooky remix) - 6:59

Notes
A ^ Included on the French version only.

Personnel
The following people contributed to The Remix Collection:
Natacha Atlas – vocals
Transglobal Underground, David Arnold – production
Coldcut, Youth – additional production
Ashiqali Kham, Nawazish Khan – vocals
Alison Fielding – art direction, design

References

External links
Official website

Natacha Atlas albums
2000 remix albums
Electronic remix albums
Beggars Banquet Records remix albums